An etymological dictionary discusses the etymology of the words listed. Often, large dictionaries, such as the Oxford English Dictionary and Webster's, will contain some etymological information, without aspiring to focus on etymology.

Etymological dictionaries are the product of research in historical linguistics. For many words in any language, the etymology will be uncertain, disputed, or simply unknown. In such cases, depending on the space available, an etymological dictionary will present various suggestions and perhaps make a judgement on their likelihood, and provide references to a full discussion in specialist literature.

The tradition of compiling "derivations" of words is pre-modern, found for example in Indian (nirukta), Arabic (al-ištiqāq) and also in Western tradition (in works such as the Etymologicum Magnum). Etymological dictionaries in the modern sense, however, appear only in the late 18th century (with 17th-century predecessors such as Vossius' 1662 Etymologicum linguae Latinae or Stephen Skinner's 1671 Etymologicon Linguae Anglicanae), with the understanding of sound laws and language change and their production was an important task of the "golden age of philology" in the 19th century.

Print
English
Robert K. Barnhart & Sol Steinmetz, eds. Barnhart Dictionary of Etymology. Bronx, NY: H. W. Wilson, 1988 (reprinted as Chambers Dictionary of Etymology).
Terry F. Hoad. The Concise Oxford Dictionary of English Etymology. Oxford: Oxford University Press, 1986.
Ernest Klein. A Comprehensive Etymological Dictionary of the English Language. 2 vols. Amsterdam: Elsevier, 1966-67.
C.T. Onions, ed. The Oxford Dictionary of English Etymology.  Oxford: Oxford University Press, 1966.
Eric Partridge, Origins: A short etymological dictionary of Modern English. New York: Greenwich House, 1958 (reprint: 1959, 1961, 1966, 2008).
Albanian
Kolec Topalli. Fjalor etimologjik i gjuhës shqipe. Durrës: Jozef, 2017.
Vladimir Orel. Albanian Etymological Dictionary. Leiden: Brill, 1998.
Eqrem Çabej. Studime etimologjike në fushë të shqipes. 7 vols. Tirana: Akademia et Shkencave e Republikës Popullore të Shqipërisë, Instituti i Gjuhësisë dhe i Letërsisë, 1976–2014.
Armenian
Hrachia Acharian. Հայերեն արմատական բառարան [Dictionary of Armenian Root Words]. 4 vols. Yerevan: Yerevan State University, 1971.
 Guevorg Djahukian. Հայերեն ստուգաբանական բառարան, [Armenian Etymological Dictionary]. Yerevan: International Linguistic Academy, 2010.
 Hrach K. Martirosyan. Etymological dictionary of the Armenian inherited lexicon. Leiden, Boston: Brill, 2010.
Breton
Albert Deshayes. Dictionnaire étymologique du breton. Douarnenez: Le Chasse-Marée, 2003.
Chinese
Axel Schuessler. ABC Etymological Dictionary of Old Chinese. Honolulu: University of Hawaii Press, 2007. 
Czech
Holub, J., Kopečný, F. Etymologický slovník jazyka českého. Prague: Státní nakladatelství učebnic (1952) [1933]
Machek, Václav. Etymologický slovník jazyka českého. Prague: NLN, Nakladatelství Lidové noviny (2010 [1971]) [1957]
Holub, J. & S. Lyer. Stručný etymologický slovník jazyka českého se zvláštním zřetelem k slovům kulturním a cizím. Prague: SPN (1992) [1967]
Rejzek, Jiří. Český etymologický slovník. Voznice: LEDA (2012 [2001])
 Danish
 
 
Dutch
Marlies Philippa, Frans Debrabandere, A. Quak, T. Schoonheim, & Nicoline van der Sijs, eds. Etymologisch woordenboek van het Nederlands (EWN). 4 vols. Amsterdam: Amsterdam University Press, 2003–09.
Jan de Vries. Nederlands etymologisch woordenboek (NEW), 4th edn. Leiden: Brill, 1997 (1st edn. 1971).
Finnish
 Suomen sanojen alkuperä [The Origin of Finnish Words]. 3 vols. Helsinki: Kotimaisten kielten tutkimuskeskus / Suomalaisen Kirjallisuuden Seura, 1992–2000 (vol. 1, A–K 1992; vol. 2, L–P 1995; vol. 3, R–Ö 2000).
French
Alain Rey, ed. Dictionnaire historique de la langue française, 4th edn. 2 vols. Paris: Le Robert, 2016 (1st edn. 1992).
Emmanuèle Baumgartner & Philippe Ménard. Dictionnaire étymologique et historique de la langue française. Paris: Livre de Poche, 1996.
. Dictionnaire étymologique du français. Paris: Le Robert, 1971.
Albert Dauzat, Jean Dubois, & Henri Mitterand. Nouveau dictionnaire étymologique et historique, 2nd edn. Paris: Larousse, 1964 (1st edn. 1938).
Oscar Bloch & Walther von Wartburg. Dictionnaire étymologique de la langue française, 2nd edn. Paris: PUF, 1950 (1st edn. 1932).
Walther von Wartburg & Hans-Erich Keller, eds. Französisches etymologisches Wörterbuch: Eine Darstellung des gallormanischen Sprachschatzes (FEW). 25 vols. Bonn: Klopp; Heidelberg: Carl Winter; Leipzig–Berlin: Teubner; Basel: R. G. Zbinden, 1922–67 (some vols. have since been revised).
German
Elmar Seebold, ed. Etymologisches Wörterbuch der deutschen Sprache [ Etymological Dictionary of the German Language ], 26th edn. Originally by Friedrich Kluge. Berlin: Walter de Gruyter, 2013 (1st edn. 1883).
Wolfgang Pfeifer, ed. Etymologisches Wörterbuch des Deutschen, 7th edn. Munich: dtv, 2004 (1st edn., 1995).
Gunther Drosdowsi, Paul Grebe, et al., eds. Duden, Das Herkunftswörterbuch: Etymologie der deutschen Sprache, 5th edn. Berlin: Duden, 2013.
Sabine Krome, ed. Wahrig, Herkunftswörterbuch, 5th edn. Originally by Ursula Hermann. Gütersloh–Munich: Wissenmedia, 2009.
Greek
Georgios Babiniotis. Ετυµολογικό λεξικό της νέας ελληνικής γλώσσας [= Etymological Dictionary of the Modern Greek Language]. 2 vols. Athens: Κέντρο λεξικογραφίας, 2010.
 Ancient Greek
Robert S. P. Beekes. Etymological Dictionary of Greek. 2 vols. Leiden: Brill, 2010.
Pierre Chantraine. Dictionnaire étymologique de la langue grecque: Histoire des mots, revised 2nd edn. 2 vols. Revised by Jean Taillardat, Olivier Masson, & Jean-Louis Perpillou. Paris: Klincksieck, 2009 (2nd edn. 1994; 1st edn. 1968–80 in 4 vols.).
Hjalmar Frisk. Griechisches etymologisches Wörterbuch. 3 vols. Heidelberg: Carl Winter, 1960–72.
Hittite
Alwin Kloekhorst. Etymological Dictionary of the Hittite Inherited Lexicon. Leiden–Boston: Brill, 2008.
Jaan Puhvel. Hittite Etymological Dictionary. 10 vols. Berlin: Mouton de Gruyter, 1984–present.
Hungarian
Zaicz Gábor. Etimológiai szótár: Magyar szavak és toldalékok eredete. Budapest: TINTA, 2006.
András Róna-Tas & Árpád Berta. West Old Turkic: Turkic Loanwords in Hungarian. 2 vols. Wiesbaden: Harrassowitz, 2011.
István Tótfalusi. Magyar etimológiai nagyszótár. Budapest: Arcanum Adatbázis, 2001.
Icelandic
Ásgeir Blöndal Magnússon, Íslensk orðsifjabók
Italian
Alberto Nocentini. L’Etimologico: vocabolario della lingua italiana. With the collaboration of Alessandro Parenti. Milan: Mondadori, 2010.
Manlio Cortelazzo & Paolo Zolli. Dizionario etimologico della lingua italiana (DELIN), 2nd edn. Bologna: Zanichelli, 2004 (1st edn. 5 vols., 1979-1988).
Latin
Michiel de Vaan. Etymological Dictionary of Latin and the Other Italic Languages. Leiden: Brill, 2008.
Alois Walde. Lateinisches etymologisches Wörterbuch, 3rd edn. 2 vols. Revised by Johann Baptist Hofmann. Heidelberg: Carl Winter, 1938–54 (1st edn. 1906).
Alfred Ernout & Antoine Meillet. Dictionnaire étymologique de la langue latine: Histoire des mots (DELL), 4th rev. edn. 2 vols. Revised by Jacques André. Paris: Klincksieck, 1985 (4th edn. 1959–60; 1st edn. 1932).
Latvian
Konstantīns Karulis. Latviešu Etimoloģijas Vārdnīca. Rīga: Avots, 1992.
Lithuanian
Ernst Fraenkel, Annemarie Slupski, Erich Hofmann, & Eberhard Tangl, eds. Litauisches etymologisches Wörterbuch (LitEW). 2 vols. Heidelberg: Carl Winter; Göttingen: Vandenhoeck & Ruprecht, 1962–65.
Wolfgang Hock et al. Altlitauisches etymologisches Wörterburch (ALEW). 3 vols. Hamburg: Baar Verlag, 2015.
Old Church Slavonic
Etymologický slovník jazyka staroslověnského (ESJS).  18 vols. (A–zakonъ). Prague: Academia, 1989– . .
Old Irish
 Sanas Cormaic, encyclopedic dictionary, 9th or 10th century
Joseph Vendryes, E. Bachellery, & Pierre-Yves Lambert. Lexique étymologique de l'irlandais ancien (LÉIA). 7 vols. Dublin: Dublin Institute for Advanced Studies; Paris: CNRC Éditions, 1959–1996 (incomplete).
 Old Prussian
Vytautas Mažiulis, Prūsų kalbos etimologijos žodynas (1988–1997), Vilnius.
Polish
Aleksander Brückner, Słownik etymologiczny języka polskiego, 1st edn. Kraków: Krakowska Spółka Wydawnicza, 1927 (9th edn. - Warsaw: Wiedza Powszechna, 2000).
Wiesław Boryś, Słownik etymologiczny języka polskiego, 1st edn. Kraków: Wydawnictwo Literackie, 2005.
Portuguese
J.P. Machado. Dicionário etimológico da língua portuguesa, 3rd edn. 5 vols. Lisbon, 1977 (1st edn. 1952).
Antonio Geraldo da Cunha. Dicionário etimológico da língua portuguesa. Rio de Janeiro: Nova Fronteira, 1982.
Russian
Pavel Yakovlevich Chernykh. Историко-этимологический словарь современного русского языка. 2 vols. Moscow: Русский язык. 1993.
Vladimir Orel. Russian Etymological Dictionary. 4 vols. Edited by Vitaly Shevoroshkin & Cindy Drover-Davidson. Calgary, Canada: Octavia Press (vols. 1-3) & Theophania Publishing (vol. 4), 2007-2011.
Max Vasmer. Russisches etymologisches Wörterbuch. 3 vols. Heidelberg: Carl Winter, 1953-58. (Translated into Russian and expanded by Oleg Trubachov, Этимологический словарь русского языка. 4 vols. Moscow: Прогресс, 1959-1961.)
Terence Wade. Russian Etymological Dictionary. Bristol: Bristol Classical Press, 1996.
Sanskrit
Manfred Mayrhofer. Kurzgefaßtes etymologisches Wörterbuch des Altindischen (KEWA). 3 vols. Heidelberg: Carl Winter, 1956–1976.
Manfred Mayrhofer. Etymologisches Wörterbuch des Altindoarischen (EWAia). 3 vols. Heidelberg: Carl Winter, 1992/1998/2001.
Sardinian
Max Leopold Wagner. Dizionario etimologico sardo (DES). 2 vols. Revised by Giulio Paulis. Nuoro: Ilisso, 2008 (1st edn. 3 vols., Heidelberg: Carl Winter, 1960–4).
Massimo Pittau. Dizionario della lingua sarda fraseologico ed etimologico (DILS). 2 vols. Cagliari: E. Gasperini, 2000–03.
Scots
John Jamieson, An Etymological Dictionary of the Scottish Language (1808), revised 1879–97.
Serbo-Croatian
Marta Bjeletić et al. Етимолошки речник српског језика. 3 vols. (unfinished) Beograd: Srpska akademija nauka i umetnosti, 2003–.
Alemko Gluhak. Hrvatski etimološki rječnik. Zagreb: August Cesarec, 1993.
Ranko Matasović, Tijmen Pronk, Dubravka Ivšić, Dunja Brozović Rončević. Etimološki rječnik hrvatskoga jezika. 2 vols. Zagreb: Institut za hrvatski jezik i jezikoslovlje, 2016–21.
Petar Skok. Etimologijski rječnik hrvatskoga ili srpskoga jezika [Etymological Dictionary of the Croatian or the Serbian Language]. 4 vols. Zagreb: Jugoslavenska akademija znanosti i umjetnosti, 1971–4.
Slovene
France Bezlaj. Etimološki slovar slovenskega jezika. Ljubljana: SAZU, 1977., 
Marko Snoj. Slovenski etimološki slovar. Ljubljana: Založba Modrijan, 2003., 
Spanish
Joan Corominas. Diccionario crítico etimológico castellano e hispánico (DCECH). 6 vols. Madrid: Gredos, 1980–91
Guido Gómez de Silva. Elsevier's Concise Spanish Etymological Dictionary. Amsterdam–NY: Elsevier Sciences, 1985.
Edward A. Roberts. A Comprehensive Etymological Dictionary of the Spanish Language with Families of Words Based on Indo-European Roots, 2 vols. (vol. 1: A-G; 2: H-Z). Xlibris, 2014.
Swedish
Elof Hellquist. Svensk etymologisk ordbok. Lund: Gleerups, 1922-1980.
Birgitta Ernby. Norstedts etymologiska ordbok. Stockholm: Norstedts Förlag, 2008.
Turkish
Sevan Nişanyan. Sözlerin soyağacı: çağdaş Türkçenin etimolojik sözlüğü. Beyoğlu (Istanbul): Adam, 2002.
Gerard Leslie Makins Clauson. An Etymological Dictionary of Pre-Thirteenth-Century Turkish. London: Oxford University Press, 1972.

Language families
Afro-Asiatic
Vladimir Orel & Olga V. Stolbova. Hamito-Semitic Etymological Dictionary: Materials for a Reconstruction. Leiden: Brill, 1995.
Altaic
Sergei Starostin, Anna Dybo, & Oleg Mudrak. Etymological Dictionary of the Altaic Languages. Leiden: Brill, 2003.
Celtic
Ranko Matasović. Etymological dictionary of Proto-Celtic. Leiden: Brill, 2009.
Dravidian
Thomas D. Burrows & Murray Barnson Emeneau. A Dravidian Etymological Dictionary (DED), 2nd edn. Oxford: Munshirm Manoharlal / Clarendon Press, 1984 (1st edn. 1961).
Germanic
Guus Kroonen. Etymological Dictionary of Proto-Germanic. Leiden: Brill, 2013.
Vladimir Orel. A Handbook of Germanic Etymology. Leiden: Brill, 2003.
Frank Heidermanns. Etymologisches Wörterbuch der germanischen Primäradjektive (EWgA). Berlin: Walter de Gruyter, 1993.
Proto-Indo-European
George E. Dunkel. Lexikon der indogermanischen Partikeln und Pronominalstämme (LIPP). Heidelberg: Carl Winter, 2014.
Dagmar S. Wodtko, Britta Irslinger, & Carolin Schneider. Nomina im indogermanischen Lexikon (NIL). Heidelberg: Carl Winter, 2008.
Helmut Rix. Lexikon der indogermanischen Verben: Die Wurzeln und ihre Primärstammbildungen (LIV²), 2nd edn. Wiesbaden: Reichert Verlag, 2001.
Julius Pokorny. Indogermanisches etymologisches Wörterbuch (IEW), 2 vols. Tübingen–Berne–Munich: A. Francke, 1957/1969 (reprint 2005).
 Reworking of: Alois Walde & Julius Pokorny. Vergleichendes Wörterbuch der indogermanischen Sprachen. 3 vols. Berlin: de Gruyter, 1927–32 (reprint 1973).
Carl Darling Buck. A dictionary of selected synonyms in the principal Indo-European languages. University of Chicago Press, 1949 (paperback edition 1988).
Slavic
Rick Derksen. Etymological Dictionary of the Slavic Inherited Lexicon. Leiden: Brill, 2008.
Etymological Dictionary of Slavic Languages: Proto-Slavic Lexical Stock (ESSJa). 40 vols. (A-*pakъla). Moscow: Nauka, 1974–present.
Franz Miklosich. Etymologisches Wörterbuch der slavischen Sprachen. Vienna: Wilhelm Braumüller, 1886. 547 pp.
Uralic
Károly Rédei, ed. Uralisches etymologisches Wörterbuch (UEW). 3 vols. Budapest: Akadémiai Kiadó; Wiesbaden: Harrassowitz, 1986-91.
Zaicz, Gábor. Etimológiai szótár: Magyar szavak és toldalékok eredete ("Dictionary of Etymology: The origin of Hungarian words and affixes"). Budapest: Tinta Könyvkiadó; second, revised, expanded edition published in 2021:  ( The first edition, published in 2006, is available online.)

Online

Indo-European languages
 – Croatian Language Portal, etymologies by Ranko Matasović
 – An Online Etymological Dictionary of the English language compiled by Douglas Harper
 – Ancient Greek Etymological Dictionary by H. Frisk
 – An Etymological Dictionary of the Hittite Inherited Lexicon by Alwin Kloekhorst
 – Indo-European Etymological Dictionary by S. A. Starostin et al.
 – Gaelic Etymological Dictionary by A. MacBain
 – Gothic Etymological Dictionary by Andras Rajki
 – Nepali Etymological Dictionary by R. L. Turner
 – Romanian Etymological Dictionary
 – Russian Etymological Dictionary by Max Vasmer, Heidelberg (1962), 4 volumes
 – Swedish Etymological Dictionary by Elof Hellquist

Afroasiatic languages
 – Afroasiatic Etymological Dictionary by S. A. Starostin et al.
 – Arabic Etymological Dictionary by Alphaya, LTD
 – Arabic Etymological Dictionary by Andras Rajki
 – Hebrew Etymological Dictionary by Ernest Klein

Altaic languages
 – Altaic Etymological Dictionary by S. A. Starostin et al.
 – Chuvash Etymological Dictionary by M. R. Fedotov
 – Gagauz Etymological Dictionary
 – Mongolian Etymological Dictionary
 – Turkish Etymological Dictionary by Sevan Nişanyan "Sözlerin Soyağacı – Çağdaş Türkçe'nin Etimolojik Sözlüğü" (Third ed. Adam Y. Istanbul 2007)

Austronesian languages
 – Austronesian Comparative Dictionary by R. A. Blust
 – Indonesian Etymological Dictionary by S. M. Zain
 – Maori-Polynesian Comparative Dictionary by E. Tregear
 – A Concise Waray Dictionary (Waray-Waray, Leytese-Samarese) with etymologies and Bicol, Cebuano, Hiligaynon, Ilocano, Kapampangan, Pangasinan and Tagalog cognates

Bantu languages
 – Bantu Etymological Dictionary
 – Swahili Etymological Dictionary
 – Swahili Etymological Dictionary by World Loanword Database

Creole languages and conlangs
 – Bislama Dictionary with etymologies by Andras Rajki
 – Esperanto Etymological Dictionary
 – Morisyen Etymological Dictionary
 – Volapük Dictionary

Uralic languages
 – Uralic Etymological Database (Uralonet)
 – Uralic Etymological Dictionary by S. A. Starostin et al.
 – Estonian Etymological Dictionary by Iris Metsmägi, Meeli Sedrik, Sven-Erik Soosaar
 – Finnish Etymological Dictionary
 – Zaicz, Gábor. Etimológiai szótár: Magyar szavak és toldalékok eredete (’Dictionary of Etymology: The origin of Hungarian words and affixes’). Budapest: Tinta Könyvkiadó, 2006, first edition.
Its second, revised, expanded edition published in 2021 is only available in print.
 – Tótfalusi, István. Magyar etimológiai nagyszótár (’Hungarian Comprehensive Dictionary of Etymology’). Budapest: Arcanum Adatbázis, 2001; Arcanum DVD Könyvtár, 
 – Hungarian Dictionary with etymologies by Andras Rajki
 – Saami Etymological Dictionary

Other languages and language families
 – Etymological Dictionary of Basque by R. L. Trask
 – Basque Etymological Dictionary
 – Dravidian Etymological Dictionary by T. Burrow
 – Kartvelian Etymological Dictionary by G. A. Klimov
 – Mayan Etymological Dictionary by T. Kaufman and J. Justeson
 – Mon-Khmer Etymological Dictionary by D. Cooper and P. J. Sidwell
 – Munda Etymological Dictionary by D. Cooper
 – Munda Etymological Dictionary by D. Stampe et al.
 – North Caucasian Etymological Dictionary by S. A. Starostin et al.
 – Sino-Tibetan Etymological Dictionary and Thesaurus by J. A. Matisoff
 – Thai Etymological Dictionary by M. Haas

See also 
 Historical dictionary
 List of proto-languages

External links
Etymological Bibliography of Take Our Word For It, the only Weekly Word-origin Webzine
Indo-European Etymological Dictionary (IEED) at Leiden University 
Internet Archive Search: Etymological Dictionary Etymological Dictionaries in English at the Internet archive
Internet Archive Search: Etymologisches Wörterbuch Etymological Dictionaries in German at the Internet archive
Online Etymology Dictionary (see also its Wikipedia article)

 
Dictionaries
Dictionaries by type